A statue of Charles Sumner by Anne Whitney is installed in Cambridge, Massachusetts' General MacArthur Square, United States.

See also

 Statue of Charles Sumner (Boston)

References

External links
 

Monuments and memorials in Massachusetts
Outdoor sculptures in Cambridge, Massachusetts
Sculptures of men in Massachusetts
Statues in Massachusetts